The Sincheon-daero (Korean: 신천대로) is an 8-lane highway located in Daegu, Republic of Korea.
South Daegu IC ~ West Daegu IC section runs parallel with Jungbu Naeryuk Expressway and is called the City Expressway (도시고속도로).

History 
29 September 1987 : Samdeok-dong ~ Daebong-dong (1.0 km), Paldalgyo ~ Chimsangyo (4.0 km) section opens to traffic.
March 1994 : Paldalgyo ~ Sangdonggyo section opens to traffic.
July 1996 : Guma Expressway Branch (구마고속도로 지선 / West Daegu IC ~ Paldalgyo Ramp) went out of use for expressway and was incorporated into Sincheon-daero.
June 2010 : South Daegu IC ~ West Daegu IC section opens to traffic.
20 September 2011 : Ihyeon Ramp opens to traffic.
27 December 2013 : Sicheon Jwaan-doro section (6.69 km) opens to traffic.

1987 establishments in South Korea
Roads in Daegu